The Genesis Quest is a 1986 science fiction novel by American writer Donald Moffitt. It is part of a two-part series, the conclusion of the story being offered in Second Genesis.

Plot summary
An alien race (The Nar) assemble humans from a stream of genetic information transmitted by radio from the Milky Way Galaxy.  The resulting colony of humans spend some time integrated into the Nar society before growing restless, discovering the secret of human longevity, and embarking on the seemingly impossible millennia-long mission of a physical journey back to Earth.  This epic journey is made in a gigantic space-grown semi-sentient Dyson tree known as Yggdrasil.

1986 novels
1986 science fiction novels
Novels by Donald Moffitt